Shri Jihveshwara is the name of the god who is worshipped by people of Swakula Sali caste in India. The name Jihveshwara comes from Jihva (tongue) + Ishvara (god), which means the one who is born out of tongue.

References

Regional Hindu gods